Nebria rubicunda rubicunda is a subspecies of brown coloured ground beetle in the Nebriinae subfamily that can be found in Algeria, Morocco, Tunisia, and Spain.

References

External links
Nebria rubicunda rubicunda at Fauna Europaea

rubicunda rubicunda
Beetles described in 1806
Beetles of North Africa
Beetles of Europe
Taxa named by Conrad Quensel